Richards High School may refer to:
Harold L. Richards High School in Oak Lawn, Illinois
Richards Career Academy in Chicago, Illinois